Polyommatus dolus, the furry blue, is a butterfly of the family Lycaenidae. It is found in Spain (from Huesca to Santander - Burgos), in France (Herault and from the Cevennes to the Maritime Alps) and  Italy (Central Italy and Maritime Alps).

It is escribed in Seitz thus- 
L. dolus Hbn. (= lefebvrei Godt.) (81 f). male above with a light, silky, grey-blue gloss, nearly as in coridon, but this gloss is restricted to the outer half of the wing, the proximal half being a dirty brown. Female above dark brown with darker veins, resembling almost exactly a male of ripartii on the upperside. Underside rather similar to that of admetus, clearer, with smaller ocelli and without white mesial streak. In South France, and Northern and Central Italy. — ab. vittata Oberth. (81 f) [now P. d. vittata (Oberthür, 1892)] are specimens with a whitish mesial streak on the hindwing beneath; from the Cevennes (Lozere). — menalcas Frr. (= epidolus Frr.) (81 g) is a form from Anterior Asia (or a distinct species?) [now full species Polyommatus menalcas (Freyer, 1837) ] which has a paler underside, smaller ocelli and a very distinct sharply defined mesial streak on the hindwing beneath. In the male the brown colour of the upperside is restricted to the forewing and here concentrated into a dirty brown patch. Turkey and Asia Minor to Turkestan. Larva green when young. later on violet; until June on Onobrychis and Medicago. The butterflies from June till August, locally plentiful, especially flying on fields of Esparcet.

Habitats are dry acid grassland, dry calcareous grasslands and steppes and sclerophyllous scrub at 600-1800m.
The butterfly flies from July to  August.

The larvae feed on Onobrychis viciifolia and Medicago species.

References

External links
Pyrgus.de Photographs imago, larvae

dolus
Butterflies of Europe
Butterflies described in 1823